Tchitondi is a small village in the Republic of the Congo.

Transport 

It is served by a station on the Congo-Ocean Railway.

Accidents 

On 22 June 2010, a serious train derailment down a nearby ravine saw 72 or more casualties.

See also 

 Railway stations in Republic of the Congo

References 

Populated places in the Republic of the Congo